Bonisteel is a surname. Notable people with the surname include:

Roscoe Bonisteel (1888–1972), American lawyer
Roy Bonisteel (1930–2013), Canadian journalist and television host

See also
Bonesteel (disambiguation)